Reindalen is a valley in Nordenskiöld Land at Spitsbergen, Svalbard. It has a length of about 38 kilometers. The valley stretches westwards from the mountain pass Reindalspasset, and debouches into Van Mijenfjorden, in the bay Kaldbukta at the northern side of the fjord. The river Reindalselva flows through the valley. Reindalen is the largest ice free valley of Svalbard, and is included in the Nordenskiöld Land National Park.

References

Valleys of Spitsbergen